Binzhou, formerly Putai, is a prefecture-level city in northern Shandong Province in the People's Republic of China. The city proper sits on the northern bank of the Yellow River, while its administrative area straddles both sides of its lower course before its present delta. As of the 2020 census, its population was 3,928,568 inhabitants (3,748,474 in 2010), and its built-up (or metro) area made of Bincheng and Zhanhua urban Districts was home to 1,188,597 inhabitants.

History

Human settlement dates to at least the Chinese Neolithic. During the Shang, the area around Binzhou was held by the Pugu, who were counted among the "Eastern Barbarians" or Dongyi. Pugu joined the Shang prince Wu Geng's failed rebellion against the Zhou and was destroyed , with its lands given to the minister Jiang Ziya as the march of Qi. The Bamboo Annals suggest the Pugu continued to trouble the Zhou for another decade and state they were again destroyed . Qi became one of the most powerful of China's Warring States but was ruled from Yingqiu (modern Zibo), except for a brief hiatus under Duke Hu. He relocated to Bogu but was overcome by the revolting people of Yingqiu; his successor restored the former capital.

The name Binzhou arose under the Five Dynasties period because its land then bordered the Bay of Bohai. The deposition of silt from the Yellow River—which assumed its present course after the disastrous floods of the 1850s—has since moved the site well inland. The city itself was known as Putai into the 20th century, but Putai County was abolished in March 1956 and the name now survives only as the town's Pucheng Subdistrict.

Public works have reduced the destructiveness of the river, permitting Binzhou and neighboring Dongying to be developed into cities. The former Huimin Prefecture was renamed Binzhou in 1984. It was given city status in 1992. Its administrative area presently has more than 3.9 million inhabitants. The major Industries are based on oil, chemicals, and textiles.

Administration
The prefecture-level city of Binzhou administers seven county-level divisions, including two districts, one county-level city and four counties.

 Bincheng District
 Zhanhua District
 Zouping city
 Boxing County
 Huimin County
 Yangxin County
 Wudi County

Geography
 
 
Binzhou lies on the alluvial plain formed by the Yellow River. The entire length of countryside around the river from Pucheng Subdistrict to the Bay of Bohai has been created by deposition of sediment since the Qin Dynasty. The present prefecture borders (counterclockwise from due west) Dezhou, Jinan, Zibo, Dongying, the Bay of Bohai, and Hebei.

Climate
Binzhou has a monsoon-influenced humid continental climate (Köppen Dwa), with four well-defined seasons. Binzhou is one of the warmest cities in the world with a continental climate, with summers reaching as high as 31 °C, and the average temperature in the city being 13.0 °C. Conditions are warm and nearly rainless in spring, hot and humid in summer, crisp in autumn and cold and dry in winter. More than half of the annual precipitation occurs in July and August alone; snow occasionally falls during winter, though heavy falls are very rare.

Transportation
 
 China National Highway 220
 China National Highway 205

Education
 Binzhou Medical University
 Binzhou University

Notable people
 Sun Tzu, Spring and Autumn period military general and strategist, author of the Art of War.
 Xu Yan, kickboxer
 Zhang Shiping, businessman

Economy
Binzhou, and neighboring Dongying, has historically had an agrarian economy. Binzhou is known regionally for its "dongzao" (literally, winter dates). After the Shengli Field was discovered, most of the field was incorporated into newly created Dongying, although Binzhou maintain some oil operations. Binzhou has been diversifying its economy away from agriculture by attracting manufacturing and foreign direct investment into the city. Among Binzhou's large businesses include Weiqiao, a textile company, and Binzhou Pride, a new auto company targeting the growing low-cost market.  ±õÖÝÆÕÀ³µÂÆû³µ¹¤ÒµÓÐÏÞ¹«Ë¾

The Binzhou local government has also plowed resources into a new economic development zone on the outskirts of the new city, complete with a man-made lake. Binzhou economic development zone

Binzhou's role in pet food crisis
In April 2007, Binzhou made international headlines when Binzhou Futian Biology Technology, in Wudi County, was identified by US officials as one of two sources of contaminated wheat gluten in the 2007 pet food recalls. Shortly after, the company was shuttered by Chinese authorities, who also detained its general manager.

Reform

In 2004, the Binzhou government implemented Democratic Political Discussion Day, held on the 5th of each month. Under this scheme, every village-level government on this day is required to hold "open debate" and conference for villagers (essentially a town hall). At these meetings, a monthly financial report is presented, highlighting past and planned expenditure, investment performance and such other financial information. In theory, this is supposed to open village finances to greater public scrutiny and debate. Also released at these meetings are reports on the past performance of the government and governmental officials, and future actions and decisions planned, and just like the financial reports, these are also under the public scrutiny and debate. The resulting event is a secret ballot for every villager to vote for everything discussed at these meetings and governments cannot proceed on any issues unless they are passed with a majority vote. The issues passed by popular vote would then be carried out, and at the same time, the government would also make improvement and adjustment on the policies and issues that did not pass, and then present the revisions for the public scrutiny and debate at the next meeting.

Result of the political reform
Ever since the implementation of the political reform at Binzhou, the policy and performance have become transparent and obvious, corruption was checked, cadres' performance and popular support increased, and economy has steadily developed. The letters of petition from villagers to the government reduced more than 30%, and more importantly, in comparison to the era prior to the implementation of the political reform where over 90% of the petitions were criticism and complaints, over 90% of the petition after the implementation of the political reform was suggestions for improvement and requests for assistance.

The obvious achievement of the political reform of Binzhou is widely reported in the domestic Chinese media, as well as many overseas Chinese media, such as Zhong Guo Daily News in Southern California, or its more commonly known Chinese name among local Chinese readers, China Daily (Not to be confused China Daily, the official English publication of Chinese government), and is termed by both domestic and overseas scholars as a good example for governments in other parts of China to follow, and along with Chinese media, they have urged authorities to slowly but steadily expand the reform to a greater scale.

City gallery

References

 
Cities in Shandong
Prefecture-level divisions of Shandong